Wadjet ("Green One"), known to the Greek world as Uto or Buto among other renderings including Wedjat, Uadjet, and Udjo, was originally the ancient Egyptian local goddess of the city of Dep. It became part of the city that the Egyptians named Per-Wadjet ("House of Wadjet") and the Greeks called Buto (now Desouk), also being the capital of the 6th lower Egyptian nome (present day Tall al-Farāʿīn), Wadjet it's patron deity, which was an important site in prehistoric Egypt and the cultural developments of the Paleolithic. There was also a Per-Wadjet in Upper Egypt.

Wadjet was closely associated in ancient Egyptian religion with the Eye of Ra, a powerful protective deity. The hieroglyph for her eye is shown below; sometimes two are shown in the sky of religious images. Per-Wadjet also contained a sanctuary of Horus, the child of the sun deity who would be interpreted to represent the pharaoh. Much later, Wadjet became associated with Isis as well as with many other deities.

History 

Wadjet was said to be the matron and protector of Lower Egypt, and upon unification with Upper Egypt, the joint protector and patron of all of Egypt.  The image of Wadjet with the sun disk is called the uraeus, and it was the emblem on the crown of the rulers of Lower Egypt. She was also the protector of kings and of women in childbirth. Wadjet was said to be the nurse of the infant god Horus. With the help of his mother Isis, they protected Horus from his treacherous uncle, Set, when they took refuge in the swamps of the Nile Delta.

From the site of Tebtunis, in the Egyptian Faiyum, a temple is dedicated to Wadjet and was the site of ritual performance in her honor.

She was associated with the land and depicted as a snake-headed woman or a snake—usually an Egyptian cobra, a venomous snake common to the region; sometimes she was depicted as a woman with two snake heads and, at other times, a snake with a woman's head. Her oracle was in the renowned temple in Per-Wadjet that was dedicated to her worship and gave the city its name. This oracle may have been the source for the oracular tradition that spread to Greece from Egypt.
From around the 4th dynasty onward, Wadjet was claimed as the patron goddess and protector of the whole of Lower Egypt and became associated with Nekhbet, depicted as a white vulture, who held unified Egypt. After the unification the image of Nekhbet joined Wadjet on the crown, thereafter shown as part of the uraeus. The religious epithet for these patron deities of the entire county was, "nebty ('Two Ladies')".

Wadjet, as the goddess of Lower Egypt, had a large temple at the ancient Imet (now Tell Nebesha) in the Nile Delta. She was worshipped in the area as the "Lady of Imet". Later she was joined by Min and Horus to form a triad of deities.

Appearance 
The Egyptian word wꜣḏ signifies blue and green. It is also the name for the well-known "Eye of the Moon". Indeed, in later times, she was often depicted simply as a woman with a snake's head, a woman wearing the uraeus, or a lion headed goddess often wearing the ureas. The uraeus originally had been her body alone, which wrapped around or was coiled upon the head of the pharaoh or another deity.

Later Wadjet often was shown coiled upon the head of Ra; in order to act as his protector, this image of her became the uraeus symbol used on the royal crowns as well.

Another early depiction of Wadjet is as a cobra entwined around a papyrus stem, beginning in the Predynastic era (prior to 3100 B.C.) and it is thought to be the first image that shows a snake entwined around a staff symbol. This is a sacred image that appeared repeatedly in the later images and myths of cultures surrounding the Mediterranean Sea, called the caduceus, which may have had separate origins.

Her image also rears up from the staff of the "flagpoles" that are used to indicate deities, as seen in the hieroglyph for "uraeus" and for "goddess" in other places.

Wadjet is occasionally depicted as other animal headed beings or depicted as other animals such as a lion, mongoose, Ichneumonidae. Notably the depiction of the mongoose serves as an antithesis to that of the cobra as it is a natural predator. While the Icheumon probably serves as a depiction of Wedjat's role in seeing for Horus. Many bronze statues of Wadjet are argued to contain Icheumon remains however confirmation on this being forensic or a visual observation is unknown.

In the relief shown in the gallery, which is on the wall of the Mortuary Temple of Hatshepsut at Luxor, there are two images of Wadjet: one of her as the Uraeus with her head through an ankh and another where she precedes a Horus hawk wearing the pschent, representing the pharaoh whom she protects.

Protector of country, pharaohs, and other deities 

Wadjet was associated with the Nile Delta region and was more associated with the world of the living. She was closely linked to pharaohs as a protective deity. She was associated, along with other goddesses, as the "eye of Ra". Wadjet was often depicted as an erect cobra with its hood extended as though she were ready to strike. At times she was depicted wearing the Red Crown of Lower Egypt. Wadjet was depicted many times in her cobra form alongside her Upper Egyptian counterpart Nekhbet, in her vulture form wearing the Red Crown on wall paintings or on the pharaoh's headdress.

Wadjet is often depicted as a winged cobra. These wings serving a dual purpose as a protective embrace and being capable of creating the breath of life often connected to the image of the Ankh that she is often depicted with. Both of these uses are vital in surviving the afterlife. An explanation for her depiction as a lion headed goddess may stem from the goddess Sekhmet through association as a powerful or dangerous goddess.

From the Temple of Kom Ombo an engraving depicts surgical equipment among which is a set of Wadjet eyes denoting it's uses as a medical item and Wadjet's role as a protector deity. Whitnin the wider relief it's contains a depiction of a Roman pharaoh offering the Wadjet Eyes to Haroeris and Senetneferet (meaning the good sister), his consort. While only the lower portion of the relief remains it's inscription describes the pharaoh's desire for Haroeris to cleanse the eyes symbolizing the two halves of Egypt and in turn restore Egypt itself. Once again this denotes Wadjet's role as a protector and unifier of Egypt.

Etymology 

The name Wadjet is derived from the term for the symbol of her domain, Lower Egypt, the papyrus. Its hieroglyphs differ from those of the Green Crown or Deshret of Lower Egypt only by the determinative, which in the case of the crown was a picture of the Green Crown and, in the case of the goddess, a rearing cobra.

Other uses 
The Nazit Mons, a mountain on Venus, is named for Nazit, an "Egyptian winged serpent goddess". According to Elizabeth Goldsmith, the Greek name for Nazit was Buto.

Gallery 

See also ==
 Ethnoherpetology
 Eye of Horus
 Snake goddess
 Snakes in mythology

Footnotes

References

 Adolf Erman, Hermann Grapow, Wörterbuch der ägyptischen Sprache, Berlin 1963
 Ana Ruiz, The Spirit of Ancient Egypt, Algora Publishing 2001
 Bianchi, Robert Steven. 2022. "A Bronze Reliquary for an Ichneumon Dedicated to the Egyptian Goddess Wadjet" Arts 11, no. 1: 21. https://doi.org/10.3390/arts11010021
 COPPENS, FILIP, and HANA VYMAZALOVÁ. “MEDICINE, MATHEMATICS AND MAGIC UNITE IN A SCENE FROM THE TEMPLE OF KOM OMBO (KO 950).” Anthropologie (1962-) 48, no. 2 (2010): 127–32. http://www.jstor.org/stable/26292902.
 James Stevens Curl, The Egyptian Revival: Ancient Egypt as the Inspiration for Design Motifs in the West, Routledge 2005
 Toby A. H. Wilkinson, Early Dynastic Egypt, Routledge 1999
 James, T. G. H. “A Wooden Figure of Wadjet with Two Painted Representations of Amasis.” The Journal of Egyptian Archaeology 68 (1982): 156–65. https://doi.org/10.2307/3821635.

External links 

 

Wikipedia Student Program